Wilhelmina may refer to:
Wilhelmina (given name), a given name and list of people with the name

People
 Wilhelmina of the Netherlands (1880–1962), Queen of the Kingdom of the Netherlands from 1890 to 1948
 Wilhelmine Amalie of Brunswick (1673–1742), empress consort of the Holy Roman Empire of the German Nation, Queen of the Germans 
 Wilhelmine of Bayreuth (1709–1758), German princess (the older sister of Frederick the Great) and composer
 Wilhelmina of Prussia, Princess of Orange (1750–1820), German princess
 Wilhelmine of Prussia (1774–1837), German princess and later queen of the Netherlands
 Princess Wilhelmine of Baden (1788–1836), German Grand Duchess of Hess and the Rhine

Places 
Wilhelmina Bay, Antarctica
Wilhelmina Mountains, Suriname
Wilhelmina, Missouri, a community in the United States

Other uses
 392 Wilhelmina, a large main-belt asteroid
 USS Wilhelmina (ID-2168), a transport for the United States Navy during World War I
 Wilhelmina Models, modeling agency founded by supermodel Wilhelmina Cooper

See also
Princess Wilhelmine of Denmark (disambiguation), several Danish princesses
Queen Wilhelmina State Park, a park in Arkansas
Vilhelmina, a locality and the seat of Vilhelmina Municipality, Sweden
Vilhelmina Municipality, a municipality in Västerbotten County, province of Lapland, Sweden
Wilhelma, zoo and botanical garden in Stuttgart, Germany
Wilhelma, Palestine, a former German templer colony